Malus halliana is an East Asian crabapple species of Malus, known by the common name Hall crabapple. Its Chinese name is chui si hai tang(垂丝海棠).

It is generally considered to be a native tree of China, although some authors maintain that it is native to Japan, and was introduced into China.

Description
Malus halliana is a tree up to 5 meters (17 feet) tall. flowers are pink. Fruits are purple.

Cultivation
The tree is cultivated as an ornamental tree, for its abundant, fragrant pink flowers.

References

External links
line drawings, Flora of China Illustrations vol. 9, fig. 77, 16-17

halliana
Crabapples
Flora of China
Flora of Japan
Garden plants of Asia
Ornamental trees